Eric Sanders (born October 22, 1958) was a guard and tackle who played 12 seasons in the National Football League.

1958 births
Living people
American football offensive linemen
Nevada Wolf Pack football players
Atlanta Falcons players
Detroit Lions players
Sportspeople from Reno, Nevada